Gerald Perrin (born 1946), is a male retired weightlifter who competed for England and Great Britain.

Weightlifting career
Perrin represented Great Britain in the 1968 Summer Olympics.

He represented England and won a gold medal in the -60 kg Combined, at the 1970 British Commonwealth Games in Edinburgh, Scotland.

References

1946 births
English male weightlifters
Commonwealth Games medallists in weightlifting
Commonwealth Games gold medallists for England
Weightlifters at the 1970 British Commonwealth Games
Weightlifters at the 1968 Summer Olympics
Olympic weightlifters of Great Britain
Living people
Medallists at the 1970 British Commonwealth Games